Widgery is a surname. Notable people with the surname include:

David Widgery (1947–1992), British Marxist writer, journalist, polemicist, physician, and activist
Frederick John Widgery (1861–1942), English artist who painted landscapes and coastal scenery in Devon and Cornwall
John Widgery, Baron Widgery (1911–1981), English judge, Lord Chief Justice of England and Wales (1971–80)
Julia Widgery (1850–1905), American artist
William Widgery (1753–1822), U.S. Representative from Massachusetts